Tarso Toh (also known as Tarso Toon or Tarson Tôh) is a volcanic field located in Chad, north of Tarso Toussidé volcano. It fills valleys and plains over an area of 80 km in east–west direction and 20–30 km in north–south direction. It contains 150 scoria cones and two maars.

The plateau encompasses about 150 separate volcanoes, some of which are found in remnants. Some lava flows at Tarso Toh have reached large distances.

Part of the field is the Begour crater. Radiocarbon dating has yielded ages of 8,300 ± 300 years ago on sediments within Begour, and Tarso Toh is considered to be a Holocene volcano.

The Tibesti features several different rock formations. A crystalline basement is covered by Mesozoic sandstones. These were subject to deformation and later overprinted by volcanic rocks. This basement is about 500-600 million years old. The recent volcanism has been explained with the existence of a mantle plume beneath Tibesti.

Climate and biota 

The climate of the region is arid but in general there is more precipitation than in the surrounding desert, which results in the formation of wadis.

Vegetation is scarce; in the proximity of waters some acacias and grasses can be found. A number of mollusc shells have been found in the Begour sediments, such as Anisus costulatus, Anisus dallonii, Biomphalaria pfeifferi, Bulinus truncatus, Gastrocopta klunzingeri, Lymnaea natalensis, Melanoides tuberculata, Pisidium sp. Segmentina angusta, Succinea sp., Thapsia vestii and Zootecus insularis, although their identification is now always clear.

See also
 List of volcanoes in Chad
 Tarso Toon, an unrelated volcano

References

Sources 
 
 
 
 

Tibesti Mountains
Mountains of Chad
Volcanoes of Chad
Maars of Chad
Volcanic fields